Sobho Dero is a town in the Khairpur District of Sindh province, Pakistan. It is located at 27°18'0N 68°24'0E with an altitude of 46 metres (154 feet). It is a Tehsil Headquarter.

References

Populated places in Khairpur District
Talukas of Sindh